Uptight may refer to:

Film and television
 Uptight (film), a 1968 American film directed by Jules Dassin
 Uptight (TV series), a 1960s Australian pop music programme
"Uptight (Oliver's Alright)", an episode of Hannah Montana

Music
 Up Tight (soundtrack), a soundtrack album from the 1968 film, by Booker T. & the MG's
 Up-Tight, a 1966 album by Stevie Wonder
 "Uptight (Everything's Alright)", a 1966 song by Stevie Wonder
 "Uptight" (Share Nelson song), 1994
 "Uptight", a song by Green Day from Nimrod
 "Uptight", a song by The Hives from Tyrannosaurus Hives